Leatherface: The Texas Chainsaw Massacre III is a 1990 American slasher film directed by Jeff Burr and is the third installment of the Texas Chainsaw Massacre series. The film stars Kate Hodge, William Butler, Ken Foree, Tom Hudson, Viggo Mortensen, Joe Unger, and R.A. Mihailoff as Leatherface. The film follows Leatherface and his cannibalistic family stalking a motorist couple in the backroads of Texas.

The film was distributed by New Line Cinema, who bought the rights to the series from The Cannon Group after producing The Texas Chainsaw Massacre 2. Initially, this film was given an X-rating by the Motion Picture Association of America, which limited the studio's release possibilities. After the studio made cuts, it was re-rated R, and New Line released it on January 12, 1990. It was refused classification in the UK upon its initial release. It has since been released on home video in both unrated and rated versions, and a cut version was accepted with an 18 certificate in the UK.

The film was both a critical and commercial failure, grossing $5.7 million at the US box office, making it the poorest performing film in the series at the time, until the release of its sequel Texas Chainsaw Massacre: The Next Generation in 1995.

Plot
Leatherface kills a young woman, Gina, and cuts off her face to make it into a mask while Gina's sister Sara watches from a nearby window. Sometime later, a couple traveling through Texas, Michelle and Ryan, reach the Last Chance Gas Station, where they meet a hitchhiker named Tex and the station's owner Alfredo. A fight soon breaks out between Tex and Alfredo when Tex finds Alfredo spying on Michelle as she uses the station restroom. As Michelle and Ryan flee in their car, they witness Alfredo apparently killing Tex with a shotgun. When Ryan and Michelle become lost, the driver of a large truck throws a dead coyote at their windshield. As Ryan changes the car's flat tire, Leatherface appears and ambushes them, but they manage to drive off unscathed.

Afterward, Michelle, Ryan, and another driver, a survivalist named Benny, crash when a bloodied Tex leaps in front of the car. Michelle, Ryan, and Benny decide to find Tex. On the way, Benny discovers a hook-handed man named Tinker, who offers his assistance in setting down road flares. Benny soon realizes Tinker's real intentions after he finds a damaged chainsaw in the back of his truck. He flees and encounters Leatherface, but is saved by Sara, who had earlier escaped Leatherface. Benny learns that Sara's entire family was killed, and that Leatherface and his family are watching the roads. Benny hears Michelle and Ryan calling for him and leaves Sara; Leatherface kills her with his chainsaw a short time later. Leatherface then attacks Michelle and Ryan, capturing the latter when he gets caught in a bear trap.

Escaping, Michelle locates a house and is captured by Tex, revealed to be one of the Sawyers, who brings her into the kitchen and introduces her to the already deceased and decomposed "Grandpa". Tinker then drags in the badly injured Ryan, whom he and Tex suspend upside-down with a pair of meat hooks. When Leatherface returns home, Tex equips him with a large golden chainsaw with the words "The saw is family" engraved on it. In the woods, Benny finds Alfredo and apparently kills him. As the family prepare for dinner in the kitchen, the Little Girl kills Ryan. Leatherface prepares to kill Michelle as well, but Benny opens fire on the house with an automatic rifle, killing Anne and presumably Tinker. Michelle escapes and flees to the woods, pursued by Leatherface, while Benny kills Tex. Benny rushes to Michelle's aid, but Leatherface apparently kills him. In revenge, Michelle apparently kills Leatherface.

As dawn breaks, Michelle reaches the main road, before Alfredo's pickup truck, driven by a surviving Benny, stops in front of her. As Benny helps her into the truck, Alfredo appears and attacks him. Benny avoids Alfredo's attacks, and Michelle kills Alfredo before the pair drive away, unaware that a surviving Leatherface is revving his chainsaw some distance away.

Cast

 Kate Hodge as Michelle
 William Butler as Ryan
 Ken Foree as Benny
 Toni Hudson (billed as Tom Hudson) as Sara
 Viggo Mortensen as Edward "Tex" Sawyer
 Joe Unger as Tinker "Tink" Sawyer
 R. A. Mihailoff as Leatherface
 Tom Everett as Alfredo Sawyer
 Jennifer Banko as Little girl
 Beth DePatie as Gina
 Duane Whitaker as Kim
 Miriam Byrd-Nethery as "Mama" Anne Sawyer
 Caroline Williams as Vanita "Stretch" Brock (uncredited)

Production

After the success of the Nightmare on Elm Street franchise, New Line Cinema bought the rights to The Texas Chainsaw Massacre from The Cannon Group with the intention of turning it into a new series. New Line CEO Bob Shaye hoped to move on from the comedic tone of The Texas Chainsaw Massacre 2 and bring the series back to its gritty roots and  project the title character Leatherface as the primary star, above that of his cannibalistic family. The studio fast-tracked development and shot a teaser trailer, supposedly with Kane Hodder as Leatherface, before a director was even hired. Producer Michael De Luca hired novelist David J. Schow, who was reworking the studio's A Nightmare on Elm Street 5: The Dream Child at the time, to pen the script. Tom Savini and Peter Jackson were considered to direct before Jonathan Betuel was eventually hired as director. Betuel departed the project for unstated reasons leading to the studio hiring Stepfather II filmmaker Jeff Burr to direct the film. New Line began scouting locations in July 1989. In a statement, they said they were "going back to hard-core horror". Burr wanted Gunnar Hansen to return to the role of Leatherface but the parties couldn't come to an agreement on financial remuneration. Burr turned to his colleague R.A. Mihailoff to audition for the role after Hansen was out. Viggo Mortensen was cast by Burr after being impressed with his performance in Prison.

Shooting took place in Valencia, California at the end of July 1989. The director intended to film on 16 mm in Texas, but set construction had already begun in California prior to Burr signing on. With production going over schedule and over budget, the studio fired Burr one week into production, but with no one else to replace him, the studio rehired Burr. During production, a wildfire destroyed several locations and crew members would quit on set. Filming also supposedly took place less than a mile from a Six Flags, leading to screaming being heard during certain scenes of the finished film. The aforementioned Kane Hodder served as stunt coordinator for the film and as a stunt double for Mihailoff.

Release

Censorship
The film gained a certain amount of notoriety prior to release due to a battle between New Line Cinema and the MPAA, which initially rated the film an X because of its graphic violence. It was the final film to receive this rating before the MPAA replaced X with NC-17.  Burr cited as issues involved that the studio was independent, Texas Chainsaw Massacre 2 had been released unrated, and the film's grim tone. The studio eventually relented and trimmed the more graphic elements.  Burr said that the film's negatives themselves were cut to maintain the film's release deadline. The film was rejected by the British Board of Film Classification upon submission for theatrical release in 1990, and the trimmed version gained an 18 certificate when submitted for video in 2004. A total of 4 minutes and 18 seconds was cut in order to gain MPAA approval.

Theatrical release
Leatherface: The Texas Chainsaw Massacre III was originally slated for a November 3, 1989 theatrical release and a comedic teaser trailer made of original footage that directly parodies the lady of the lake scene from Excalibur was released in the summer of 1989. However, the release date was soon pushed to the following year and it opened in 1,107 theaters on January 12, 1990, grossing $2,692,087 in its opening weekend, ranking a low number 11, with an average gross of $2,431 per theater.
The film saw a 56.2% drop in its second weekend, grossing $1,442,554 with a total domestic gross of $5,765,562.

Home media
The film was released on VHS and LaserDisc by RCA/Columbia Pictures Home Video the same year.

In 2003, New Line Home Entertainment released the film in both R-rated and unrated versions on DVD. The DVD's special features include an audio commentary with Jeff Burr, Gregory Nicotero, R.A. Mihailoff, David J. Schow, William Butler, and Mark Odesky, a featurette entitled "The Saw is Family: The Making of Leatherface"; as well as a compilation of unrestored, raw and deleted scenes, along with an explanation from Jeff Burr as to why these scenes did not make the final cut; the original ending of the film was also included on the DVD. The unrated version was released on Blu-ray on February 13, 2018, as part of the Warner Brothers Archive Collection label.

Reception

The film received mostly negative reviews upon its initial release. On Rotten Tomatoes the film has an approval rating of 19% based on 16 reviews with an average rating of 4.06/10. On Metacritic, which assigns a normalized rating to reviews, the film has a weighted average score of 30 out of 100, based on 10 critics, indicating "Generally unfavorable reviews". Richard Harrington of The Washington Post blamed the failure of the film on the edits that were made to get the film an R-rating, stating "They shot an X film, but edited it down to an R to satisfy the MPAA ratings board. Whether that was just a publicity ploy or not, the lack of hard-core gore in this latest installment is quite noticeable."  Chris Parcillian of Film Threat called it "Just another generic slasher flick with nothing beyond the Leatherface connection to recommend it to discerning fans." Mark Kermode of Time Out called it "a relentlessly sadistic and worryingly amusing movie, which will entertain and offend in equal measure". Michael Wilmington of the Los Angeles Times called it "vapid  deja vu". Ryan Turek of Shock Till You Drop called the film unremarkable but fondly remembered by horror fans who were starved for theatrical releases. Bloody Disgusting rated it 4/5 stars and wrote, "As you may have guessed the movie has its flaws, but besides that I think it’s damn entertaining." Leonard Maltin gave the film 1 1/2 out of a possible 4 stars, noting that cuts to the film had severely damaged its overall coherence.

Marketing

Soundtrack

The film's soundtrack consisted of the following tracks:

Merchandise
Mezco Toyz planned to release a Leatherface figure from the film in November 2010, but the release was eventually canceled. NECA debuted an 8-inch retro-style Texas Chainsaw Massacre III Leatherface action figure at Toy Fair 2017, made widely available in September 2017.

References

External links

 

1990 horror films
1990 films
Texas Chainsaw 3
Texas Chainsaw 3
American slasher films
American sequel films
Films about cannibalism
Films directed by Jeff Burr
Films scored by Jimmy Manzie
Films set in Texas
American serial killer films
The Texas Chainsaw Massacre (franchise) films
Films originally rejected by the British Board of Film Classification
Films shot in Los Angeles County, California
1990s English-language films
1990s American films